Sebastian Rivera (born 27 August 1998) is a Stateside Puerto Rican freestyle wrestler who competes internationally at 65 kilograms. In 2022, he claimed silver at the Pan American Championships, and gold at the Matteo Pellicone Ranking Series and the Grand Prix of Spain.

Career 
Raised in New Jersey, Rivera started wrestling at a young age, winning prestigious tournaments in high school such as Super 32 and the New Jersey state championship as a senior out of Christian Brothers Academy. Entering Northwestern University in 2016, Rivera became a two-time All-American (2018 and 2019) as well as a two-time Big Ten Conference champion (2019 and 2020), but was not able to compete at the 2020 NCAA championships as they were cancelled due to the COVID-19 pandemic (granting him a new year of eligibility).

Transferring to Rutgers University as a graduate student, Rivera claimed All-American honors once again in March 2021. Afterwards, he started representing Puerto Rico in freestyle competition, competing at the World Olympic Qualification Tournament (22nd), Pan American Championships (5th), World Championships (7th) and Puerto Rican Nationals (1st). Back to folkstyle season, Rivera once again became an All-American in 2022, concluding his career as a college athlete.

In May 2022, Rivera claimed a silver medal at the Pan American Championships after making the finals. In June and July respectively, he became the prestigious Matteo Pellicone Ranking Series champion and the Grand Prix of Spain champion. He lost his bronze medal match in the 65kg event at the 2022 World Wrestling Championships held in Belgrade, Serbia.

Major results

References 

Living people
1998 births
Christian Brothers Academy (New Jersey) alumni
Northwestern Wildcats wrestlers
Rutgers Scarlet Knights wrestlers
People from Toms River, New Jersey
American sport wrestlers
American people of Puerto Rican descent
Puerto Rican sport wrestlers